Robert Fulwood Ligon (December 16, 1823 – October 11, 1901) was the fourth Lieutenant Governor of Alabama. A Democrat, Ligon served Governor George S. Houston of the same political party from 1874 to 1876.  Ligon also served in the United States House of Representatives.

The son of Robert and Wilhelmina (Fulwood) Ligon, Robert Ligon was born in Watkinsville, Georgia. Ligon began his education in the local schools of Watkinsville and later attended the University of Georgia. After graduating, Ligon moved to Tuskegee, Alabama to study law under Judge David Clopton before being admitted to the Alabama bar association. Before the American Civil War, Ligon served Alabama as a state representative, and he was a state senator in 1864.

In 1874, Ligon was elected as Lieutenant Governor. Although Ligon served his full two-year term as Lieutenant Governor, the position was eliminated in 1875 and would not be reestablished until adoption of the Alabama Constitution in 1901. Upon completion of his term, Ligon was elected to and served in the United States Congress from 1877 to 1879.he later died at age 77 in Montgomery, Alabama

References
 Alabama Department of Archives biography

External links
 Alabama Governor's Mansion - Ligon's former home

1823 births
1901 deaths
University of Georgia alumni
Democratic Party Alabama state senators
Democratic Party members of the Alabama House of Representatives
People from Oconee County, Georgia
Democratic Party members of the United States House of Representatives from Alabama
19th-century American politicians
People from Tuskegee, Alabama